President (also commonly called Asshole, Scum, or Capitalism) is a shedding card game for three or more, in which the players race to get rid of all of the cards in their hands in order to become "president" in the following round. It is a Westernized version of Chinese climbing card games such as Zheng Shangyou, and the Japanese Daifugō.

President can also be played as a drinking game, and commercial versions of the game with a non-standard deck exist, including The Great Dalmuti and Presidents Card Game.

Special titles
There may be many titles used by players during the game. Often, players move seats to sit in the order of their place, so as not to forget the order. There is generally at least a president, vice-president and scum. However, this game is usually played with up to 6 players, and if so, more titles may be needed.

The rankings for four players are as follows:
 President – the winner of the previous round, regardless of number of players.
 Vice-President ("VP") – second place, regardless of the number of players.
 Person (or other name, commonly "citizen" etc.) – the other players.
 High-Scum (Vice-Scum) (or other names) – next-to-last place. (For example, in a seven-person game, high-scum is whoever placed sixth.)
 Scum (or other names, commonly "asshole", "bum") – last place in the previous round. If the scum is last place, they get to go first to start the round.

There are other titles for games with larger numbers of player with various names.

Rules regarding card passing can be changed to accommodate these two positions if desired. A large or odd number of players generally calls for having at least one "Person" role, but there can be as many as needed.

The President (or the Scum in some versions) deals the cards, starting with themselves and proceeding in order of player hierarchy from low to high until all cards are dealt. If the Scum is the dealer, this ensures that the President begins with the fewest cards if the hands are uneven.

How to play

The rules provided are merely one of many ways known to play the game; there are many different varieties with slight twists to the rules.

Dealing
The person who is president (or the scum in some versions) shuffles and deals the cards. All the cards are dealt as evenly as possible in clockwise rotation.

After cards are dealt, the scum must hand over the best card in their hand to the president, and the president passes back any card they do not want.

Variations with multiple top and two bottom positions often require the scum to hand additional cards to the president, up to the number of top positions in the game. (For example, a game with a secretary and clerk might call for the scum to hand over three cards to the president, the high-scum to hand over two cards to the vice-president and the clerk to hand over one card to the secretary.) In any event, the players who receive cards from the bottom positions always hand back an equal number of "junk" cards that they do not want. They are not obliged to pass back their lowest cards.

Playing
Play in President is organized into tricks, much like in spades or bridge. However, unlike those games, each trick can involve more than one card played by each player, and players do not have to play a card in a trick. Suits are irrelevant in the game of president.

The player on the dealer's left begins by leading any number of cards of the same rank (1–4; 5 or more are possible with wildcards, jokers or multiple decks). The player on the left may then play an equal number of matching cards with a higher face value, or may pass. (In a few variants, it is permitted to play cards with an equal value as the last cards played. Doing so may skip the player next in order.) Note that the same number of cards as the lead must be played.  If the leader starts with a pair, only pairs may be played on top of it.  If three-of-a-kind is led, only three-of-a-kinds can be played on top of it. (There are notable exceptions among the many variants in this game.) The next player may do the same, and so on.

This continues until all players have had a turn (which may or may not be because the highest-value card has already been played), or opted to pass.

End of a round
When one player runs out of cards, they are out of play for the rest of the round, but the other players can continue to play to figure out the titles. A few versions hold that once a player goes out, players count remaining card values to establish titles, or simply count the number of cards remaining in each player's hand, and other versions have one player left with cards at the end.

When playing by traditional rules, once titles are decided, everyone needs to get up and move. The President is the dealer (or the Scum in some versions), and the players must rearrange themselves around them so that they are seated in order of rank, clockwise. Some variants do not rearrange the seating of the players, so everyone plays in the same order each hand (though the president still leads the first trick).

After the first round has determined player rank, subsequent hands are opened by the president.

President's choice and trading
In some variations of the game, after the president (or whoever deals) has dealt and everyone has received their decks, the players are able to trade cards with one another. In a group of four, the president gives two cards of their choice to scum (who responds with the two very best cards from their hand), and the vice-president gives one card of their choosing to vice-scum, who responds with their very best card. In some variants, the president may choose to allow a black market, in which any player can trade with any other player. When this happens, the President usually has a poor hand and needs better cards. The president may also allow table talk, which is when two given players (usually of adjacent ranks) let each other see each other's hands.
If there are no image cards on the hands of the (scum) there will be a new 'dealing'

Notes on game play
 The ordering of the face values is a little different from most American and English card games – the 2 is the highest value (besides the joker, if that card is used) and is unbeatable, though certain variants allow a single 2 to be topped by a pair of 2s. The ace is next highest, the King the next highest, etc. with the 3 being the lowest. A few variants allow a single deuce to be played on top of any other combination, but typically games require the same number of 2s to be played as were originally led. In a few variants, the 2 (and no other card) can be placed at any time, even if it is not the player's turn.  On the US West Coast and in Hawaii, Aces are high and 2 is the lowest card.
  It is usually played as an aces-high game, although 2s are wild and the red 3 is highest, and 2s cannot beat red 3s. The black 3s are the lowest cards, and 2s can be played as black 3s. The player goes first if they have a 3 of spades in the first round. Double 2s are not needed to clear doubles.
 Players can pass at any time, even if the player has cards that could be played. Passing does not prevent a player from playing a card the next time around.
 Players can never lead with a two or bomb.
 The number of cards that can be led to begin any trick is only dependent on the cards in the player's hand and their strategy. In a game with two decks, it is absolutely legal to start out a trick with, say, seven 5s. (In this case, obviously, seven 5s are only possible if the owner of those seven 5s is the one who begins the trick. This adds to the necessity to "capture" tricks by being the one to play the highest card.)
 Players can only play a bomb on their turn.
 If a player plays a card, and no other player can play, that card is discarded and the player puts another card to begin with. This continues until it returns to the player who played the last card: if they are unable to play on their own card, they must discard the cards and start with another card of their choice.
 Players can continue playing even after all other players have passed until the last player decides to stop playing.

Variations
In one variation, the trades between higher players and lower players are reversed. The president trades their two best cards to the scum, and the scum gives their two worst cards to the president, and the same goes with the vice president and scum. This variation is comedically known as "Communism" or "Socialism."

Some play that the holder of the lowest card of a particular suit (eg. ) leads the first deal. Others play that the scum always starts.

Certain variants allow for game-changing revolutions. If a player leads out with four of a kind, the hierarchy of all the cards will be reversed. For example, if  is the typical order of power (from left to right), after four of a kind is played it would be the reverse of that: . If another four of a kind is played, the order would switch back. Revolutions are typically utilized in the game to create better balance and avoid having the same player remain in first position forever.

In some variants, there are certain cards that are able to be played over a 2, those being the two "One-Eyed" Jacks (The Jack of Spades and the Jack of Hearts) and the "Suicide King" (the King of Hearts), the latter of which also ranks above the former. This is often also played in conjunction with the stipulation that one fewer of a bomb card is required to be played over a trick of pairs or triples. For example, if a player plays 4 aces, it can be beaten with three 2s, both One-Eyed Jacks, or the King of Hearts. This creates a rare but interesting scenario where if all four 2s are played at once, it is unbeatable as trumping it would require 3 One-Eyed Jacks or two Suicide Kings, which is impossible if playing with only one deck.

In some variants, a player cannot end on a 2 or a joker (or any card that instantly clears the deck), otherwise they immediately become scum/super scum, regardless of who actually got rid of their cards last. (For example, in game, Bob and Alice are the only people left. Bob has an ace and a 2 in his hand. He plays the ace, which Alice cannot play on. That card is discarded, however, Bob has ended on a 2, which means he immediately becomes scum/super scum, and Alice does not fall to the lowest rank.)

In variants that include "quick-clears", a player can complete the cards on the table by playing the remaining cards of the quadruple. This is valid even if the last card played of the quadruple before the clear was a face-down or face-up card the previous player "attempted" to play in a commonly accepted charade wherein that player shows the card before picking it up along with the pile. In this type of clear, timing is key and successfully pulling it off reveals the true skill of the clearing player.

Some other smaller variant rules include the president being obligated to give their lowest cards to the scum, and the game lasting until all players empty their hands.

A variation of the game Big Two (also known as Deuces) uses the card-passing roles from the game of President.

See also
 Durak, a similar game

References

External links
 President rules at Pagat.com
 Presidents Card Game
 Examples of "house rules"
 Alternate rules

American card games
Drinking card games
Climbing games
Year of introduction missing
Multi-player card games